Nick Stagliano is a film director and producer. He has been president and producer/director of the Nazz Productions Inc., a New York-based producer and distributor of film and television entertainment contents.

Director credits 
Home of Angels (1994)
The Florentine (1999)
Good Day for It (2011)
The Virtuoso (2021)

Producer 
The 24th Day (2004)
The Florentine (1999)

References

External links
Official website

Living people
Year of birth missing (living people)
American film directors
Place of birth missing (living people)
American film producers